Abschnitt 40 (Section 40) was a German police television series broadcast between May 21, 2001 and 2006. It was aired on RTL Television.

See also
List of German television series

External links
 

RTL (German TV channel) original programming
2001 German television series debuts
2006 German television series endings
German crime television series
German-language television shows